Agnese Gustmane (née Blumberga, born 9 April 1971) is a retired professional tennis player who represented the Soviet Union and Latvia.

On 6 May 1991, Gustmane reached her best singles ranking of world number 155. On 17 September 1990, she peaked at world number 133 in the doubles rankings.

Playing for Latvia at the Fed Cup, Gustmane has accumulated a win–loss record of 17–12.

ITF finals

Singles (2–2)

Doubles (8–4)

References

External links
 
 
 
 
 

1971 births
Living people
Latvian female tennis players
Tennis players at the 1992 Summer Olympics
Olympic tennis players of Latvia
Soviet female tennis players